Series 9 of Top Gear, a British motoring magazine and factual television programme, was broadcast in the United Kingdom on BBC Two during 2007, and consisted of six episodes that were aired between 28 January and 4 March. Production on the series was delayed by several months when Richard Hammond was seriously injured after crashing the Vampire dragster racer whilst filming for the show; the first episode, which welcomed him back, showed the footage of this crash. This series was the first to introduce feature-length specials focused on road trips with motoring challenges, with other highlights including the presenters attempting to build a Space Shuttle with a Reliant Robin, creating home-made stretch limos, and reaching top speed in the Bugatti Veyron.

A compilation episode that was delayed by Hammond's accident, featuring the best moments of the eighth series and titled "Best of Top Gear", was aired on 1 March 2007. Two specials were aired after the series concluded, with the first being Top Gear of the Pops on 16 March, a crossover with the BBC's music programme Top of the Pops, focused mainly on musical performances in the programme's main studio. The second special was another feature-length motoring challenge, titled Top Gear: Polar Special, which was aired on 25 July, focused on the presenters attempting to reach the 1998 location of the North Pole. The ninth series received criticism over some of its footage, including airing a mocked-up rail safety clip shortly after a major rail accident, while its Polar Special was criticised for attempting to debunk climate change concerns.

Episodes

Best-of episodes

Spin-Off Special

Special Episode

Criticism and Controversy

"Mental" comments
Following the broadcast of the first episode of the series, several viewers complained after watching Clarkson ask Hammond how he felt after the crash with the question "Are you now a mental?", before witnessing May offer him a tissue in case he "dribbled". In response to the complaints, the BBC claimed that the comments had been merely made as a joke, but realised they would have caused offence to mentally disabled and brain-damaged viewers, and thus apologised for failing to consider this.

US Special: Cow on Camaro
Following the airing of the US Special, both the BBC and the UK media regulator Ofcom received 91 complaints in regards to the scene in which Clarkson drove to the trio's campsite with a cow tied to his Camaro. In response to this, the BBC defended the programme by stating that the cow had not been harmed or injured by Clarkson and that it had died several days previously before the scene was filmed.

Level Crossing Public Service Video
During episode 5, Clarkson filmed a segment in which he did a public service video about Level Crossings, with a reconstruction organised by Network Rail as part of their Don't Run The Risk campaign. However, the segment was heavily criticised after it had been aired. Some of the criticism it garnered was due to the fact that it was broadcast two days after the Cumbria train crash, even though the crash had not been caused by a track incursion. Other criticism was on the reconstruction by Network Rail, with Anthony Smith, chief executive of the rail watchdog Passenger Focus, stating that "We need to raise awareness of the issue, but now is not the right time." However, because the item had been delayed for several weeks due to an earlier fatal level crossing crash, it was decided that with only one more programme remaining in the series along with the frequency of level crossing accidents, that there was no other "appropriate" time to show the film without "offending" somebody.

A repeat of the episode was due to be aired on 1 March 2007, but because of another death on a level crossing that had occurred earlier that morning, it was decided that the repeat would not be shown. Instead, it was replaced with the "Best of Top Gear" episode that had been postponed by Hammond's crash.

Polar Special
Following the broadcast of the Polar Special, the BBC Trust found that the scene in which both Jeremy Clarkson and James May were shown to be drinking a gin and tonic whilst driving through an ice field, could "glamorise the misuse of alcohol" and that it "was not editorially justified in the context of a family show pre-watershed", despite the producer's claiming they were beyond the jurisdiction of drink driving laws, and Clarkson stating on the programme that he was not driving but "sailing" (piloting a vehicle on (frozen) water as opposed to actual land).

In addition, Emily Armistead, a speaker of Greenpeace, heavily criticised the episode. In an article by the Daily Express, she condemned the feature as being "highly irresponsible", further adding that Top Gear had taken some of most polluting vehicles on the road to try to destroy the Arctic quicker than climate change was and that Clarkson "represented some climate-sceptic views and for someone to be on national television saying that is quite alarming."

The final car destination shows 78°35'07.0"N 104°11'09.0"W as the North Pole, which is somewhere west of Ellef Ringnes Island, and was the location of the Magnetic North Pole in 1996.

References

2007 British television seasons
Top Gear seasons